Ministry of Health and Medical Services may refer to:
 Ministry of Health and Medical Services (Fiji)
 Ministry of Health and Medical Services (Kiribati)
 Ministry of Health and Medical Services (Solomon Islands)